Clinton Field  is a public use airport located four nautical miles (7 km) northwest of the central business district of Wilmington, a city in Clinton County, Ohio, United States. It is owned by the Clinton County Board of Commissioners. This airport is included in the FAA's National Plan of Integrated Airport Systems (2009-2013), which categorizes it as a general aviation facility.

Facilities and aircraft 
It has one runway designated 3/21 with an asphalt surface measuring 3,579 by 65 feet (1,091 x 20 m). During May through September the airport is attended from 08:00 to 20:00. During October through April it is attended from 08:00 to 17:00. The fixed-base operator (FBO) is closed Thanksgiving, Christmas and Easter.

For the 12-month period ending September 9, 2019, the airport had 27,860 aircraft operations, an average of 74 per day: 97% general aviation, 2% air taxi and less than 1% military. At that time there were 27 aircraft based at this airport.

References

External links 
 GW Aviation, the fixed-base operator (FBO)
 

Airports in Ohio
Buildings and structures in Clinton County, Ohio
Transportation in Clinton County, Ohio